Clematis pubescens, known locally as common clematis, is a climbing shrub of the family Ranunculaceae with white blooms, found in coastal regions of southern Western Australia.

pubescens
Eudicots of Western Australia